Wood Street in Bath, Somerset, England was built in 1778 an has been designated as a Grade I listed building.

The street was designed by John Wood, the Elder and built by Thomas Baldwin in the same style as the adjacent Queen Square.

Gallery

See also

 List of Grade I listed buildings in Bath and North East Somerset

References

Houses completed in 1778
Grade I listed buildings in Bath, Somerset
Streets in Bath, Somerset